Volunteers for English in Sri Lanka (VESL) was established to provide children at rural Sri Lankan schools with the opportunity to gain from enthusiastic and creative native English speakers. VESL's projects aim to encourage learning, advance confidence levels in spoken English and promote cultural understanding.

VESL is a charity that aims to provide unique, exciting and worthwhile volunteering opportunities for adults of all ages in rural communities across Sri Lanka. Each year VESL volunteers run a series of English summer schools for pupils and teachers in Sri Lanka, and in 2006 VESL also hopes to run a series of teacher-training workshops for specialist English teachers in the country.

External links 
 Volunteers for English in Sri Lanka - Volunteers for English in Sri Lanka
 Charities Commission for England and Wales - details of registered charity status

Educational organisations based in Sri Lanka